Walter Hahn may refer to:

 Gunther (wrestler) (born 1987), Austrian professional wrestler and trainer
 Walter Hahn (football manager), German football manager who managed Lithuania